Monochroa sepicolella is a moth of the family Gelechiidae. It is found from central and northern Europe to the Ural Mountains, the Caucasus and southern Siberia.

The wingspan is 10–12 mm. Adults are on wing from June to August.

The larvae feed on Fallopia dumetorum and Rumex thyrsiflorus. They mine the leaves of their host plant. The mine has the form of a large full-depth blotch mine.

References

Moths described in 1854
Monochroa
Moths of Europe